Xiaowei is a virtual assistant from Tencent, the $346 billion Chinese company that operates WeChat, a messaging app with 1 billion users, and one of the main tech ecosystems in China. Xiaowei has weather reports, traffic updates, music requests, news snippets. There’s voice recognition and facial recognition, and a "Skill platform" SDK for hardware developers to plug into.

References

Virtual assistants